The Popular Guard or Popular Guards – PG ( | Al-Harās al-Sha‘abī) or Garde Populaire – GP in French, was the military wing of the Lebanese Communist Party (LCP), which fought in the 1975–1977 phase of the Lebanese Civil War and subsequent conflicts. The LCP and its militia were members of the Lebanese National Movement (LNM) and its successor, the Lebanese National Resistance Front (LNRF).

Origins
The LCP's military wing was not only well-organized, but also one of the largest secular and non-sectarian militias in Lebanon. It was first founded unofficially during the 1958 civil war, fighting alongside the anti-government forces against the Lebanese Army and the allied Christian militias. Disbanded upon the conclusion of the war, in early 1969 the Party's Politburo decided to quietly raise a new militia force ostensibly to help defend the border villages located in South Lebanon. The reality, however, was more complex. Like other political groups in Lebanon, the LCP realized in the early 1970s that without an armed militia it would lose its political relevance. Thus the "Popular Guard" was officially established on January 6, 1970, ostensibly in response to the occupation of Kfar Kila and Houla villages in the Jabal Amel region of southern Lebanon and the kidnapping of local villagers by the Israeli Defence Forces (IDF).

Prior to the war, the Popular Guards initially received covert support from the Palestine Liberation Organization (PLO), the USSR, Syria, Iraq, Libya and from well-connected left-wing sympathizers in Jordan, and some Eastern Bloc Countries, such as East Germany.

Furthermore, the LCP started sending its militiamen to training camps in Jordan under the control of the Palestinian Fatah, the Popular Front for the Liberation of Palestine (PFLP) and the Jordanian Communist Party (JCP). Moreover, the LCP's links with the Iraqi Communist Party (ICP) and the Syrian Communist Party (SCP) led them to forge close ties with the Ba'athist Iraqi and Syrian Governments to help train militants and purchase high-tech soviet arms.

Military structure and organization
Initially made up of just 600–700 poorly armed militiamen, by mid-1976 the Popular Guard's ranks had swelled to some 5,000 men and women (though other sources list a smaller number, about 3,000), this total comprising 2,000–2,500 full-time fighters and 2,500–3,000 irregulars, mostly drawn from its youth branch organization, the Union of Lebanese Democratic Youth (ULDY), which had been established in early 1970. Organized into infantry, signals, artillery, medical and Military Police 'branches', the LCP militia was first headed by the Greek Orthodox George Hawi (whose nom de guerre was Abu Anis), but in 1979 PG command was passed on to Elias Atallah, a Maronite.  Although it was active mostly in West Beirut and Tripoli, the LCP/PG also kept underground cells at the Koura District, and the Sidon, Tyre and Nabatieh Districts of the Jabal Amel region of southern Lebanon.

Illegal activities and controversy
The LCP/PG was mainly financed by the USSR and Syria, though it also received revenues from other 'unofficial' sources within Lebanon. In the mid-1980s, allied with the Red Knights militia of the Alawite Arab Democratic Party (ADP), they helped the latter to control Tripoli's commercial harbour and oil refinery – the second large deep-waters port of Lebanon – in collusion with the director of the city’s harbour Ahmad Karami and corrupt Syrian Army officers. The National Fuel Company (NFC) headed jointly by businessmen Maan Karami (brother of late prime-minister Rachid Karami) and Haj Muhammad Awadah, run in their behalf a profitable fuel smuggling ring that stretched to the Beqaa Valley.

The Popular Guards' in the 1975–1990 civil war
After the return of George Hawi, the Popular Guard joined the Lebanese National Movement (LNM) – PLO Joint Forces. The LCP militia was soon involved in many street battles against the Christian right-wing militias of the Lebanese Front. On October 24, 1975, the Popular Guards fought alongside other LNM militias such as the Al-Mourabitoun and the Nasserite Correctionist Mouvement (NCM), the Lebanese Arab Army (LAA) and the PLO at the Battle of the Hotels in Downtown Beirut, where they engaged the Lebanese Front militias and the Army of Free Lebanon (AFL).

Following the Israeli invasion of Lebanon of June 1982, the LCP/PG went underground, participating actively in the formation of the Lebanese National Resistance Front (LNRF) guerrilla alliance in September that year and later joining the LNSF in July 1983.  They fought at the 1983–84 Mountain War allied with the Druze People's Liberation Army (PLA) of the Progressive Socialist Party (PSP), Al-Mourabitoun and Syrian Socialist Nationalist Party (SSNP) militias in the Chouf District and at West Beirut against the Christian Lebanese Forces (LF) militia, the Lebanese Army and the Multinational Force in Lebanon (MNF).

When the War of the Camps broke out on April–May 1985 at West Beirut, it saw the LCP/PG participating – albeit reluctantly – in a military coalition that gathered the Druze PSP/PLA, and the Shia Muslim Amal Movement, backed by Syria, the Lebanese Army, and anti-Arafat dissident Palestinian guerrilla factions against an alliance of PLO refugee camp militias, the Nasserite Al-Mourabitoun and Sixth of February Movement militias, the Communist Action Organization in Lebanon (OCAL), and the Kurdish Democratic Party – Lebanon (KDP-L).

In December 1986, the Popular Guards joined the Arab Democratic Party (ADP), SSNP and Ba'ath Party militias in another military coalition backed by the Syrian Army, which contributed to the decisive defeat of the Sunni Muslim Islamic Unification Movement at the Battle of Tripoli.

Resistance to the Israeli occupation
On September 16, 1982, the Secretary-General of the LCP George Hawi and the Secretary-General of the OCAL Muhsin Ibrahim announced the creation of the LNRF, which rallied several Lebanese leftist and Pan-Arabist parties and armed factions to fight the Israeli occupation of southern Lebanon.

Popular Guard underground guerrilla cells continued to operate in the Jabal Amel after the end of the civil war, fighting until 2000 alongside the Shia Hezbollah and other Lebanese armed groups against the Israel Defense Forces (IDF) and their South Lebanese Army (SLA) proxies in the Israeli-controlled "security zone."

List of combat operations
 The 1958 civil war against right-wing Christian militias
 The Battle of the Hotels (Part of 2 years war)  against the Lebanese Front
 The 1978 South Lebanon conflict against the Israeli Defence Forces
 The 1982 Lebanon War and Siege of Beirut against the Israeli Defence Forces, the Lebanese Forces, and the South Lebanon Army
 The Mountain War against the Lebanese Forces, the Lebanese Army and the Multinational Force in Lebanon
 The Battle of Tripoli against the Islamic Unification Movement and other radical Islamist factions
 The 2006 Lebanon War alongside Hezbollah and Amal movement against the Israeli Defence Forces

Weapons and equipment
The collapse of the Lebanese Armed Forces (LAF) and Internal Security Forces (ISF) in January 1976 allowed the LCP/PG to seize some weapons and vehicles from their barracks and police stations, though most of its weaponry, heavy vehicles and other, non-lethal military equipments were procured in the international black market or supplied by the PLO, Syria, East Germany, Czechoslovakia, Bulgaria, Romania and the USSR.

Pistols
TT pistol
Makarov pistol
M1911A1 pistol
CZ 75

Submachine guns
Škorpion vz. 61
MP 40

Carbines and Assault Rifles
M1 Garand
StG 44
Mosin–Nagant
MAS-49 rifle
SKS
AK-47 assault rifle (Other variants included the AKM, Zastava M70, AK-63, AK-74, AK-103, Chinese Type 56, Romanian AIM and former East German MPi assault rifles)
FN FAL
FN CAL
Heckler & Koch G3
M16A1

Machine guns and autocannons
RPK Light machine gun
RPD Light machine gun
DP-28 Light machine gun
SG-43 Goryunov
PK General-purpose machine gun
Type 67 General-purpose machine gun
Rheinmetall MG 3 General-purpose machine gun
M1919A4 General-purpose machine gun
DShKM 12.7 mm Heavy machine gun (Mainly mounted on Technicals)
NSV 12.7 mm Heavy machine gun taken off from disabled tanks (Mainly mounted on Technicals)
KPV 14.5 mm Heavy machine gun (mounted on Technicals)
ZPU (ZPU-1, ZPU-2, ZPU-4) 14.5 mm Anti-aircraft guns (Mainly mounted on Technicals and Gun trucks)

Sniper rifles
Dragunov SVD
PSL (rifle)
Gepard anti-materiel rifles
M40 rifle
Steyr SSG 69
PTRS-41 14.5mm anti-tank rifle (used for heavy sniping)

Rocket launchers and grenade systems
RPG-7 shoulder-launched, anti-tank rocket-propelled grenade launcher
RPG-2 shoulder-launched, anti-tank rocket-propelled grenade launcher
Type 69 RPG shoulder-launched, anti-tank rocket-propelled grenade launcher
F1 hand grenade
RGD-5 hand grenade

Mortars
M2 mortar

Artillery
B-10 recoilless rifle
M40 recoilless rifle (mounted on Technicals)
122 mm howitzer 2A18 (D-30)
Type 63 multiple rocket launcher (mounted on Technicals)
BM-21 Grad 122 mm multiple rocket launcher

Vehicles
Jeep CJ-5 and CJ-8 
UAZ-469 
Land-Rover series II-III
Range Rover (First generation) SUV
Toyota Land Cruiser (J40)
Peugeot 504 pickup truck 
GAZ-66 light truck
Chevrolet C-50 medium-duty truck
Dodge F600 medium-duty truck
GMC C4500 medium-duty truck
GMC C7500 heavy-duty cargo truck
Many of these vehicles were employed as Technicals and Gun trucks, armed with DShkM, NSV, KPV, ZPU, ZU-23-2, and M40.

Uniforms and insignia

Fatigue clothing
Popular Guard militiamen wore in the field ex-Lebanese Army Olive Green fatigues (a special domestic variant of the US Army OG-107 cotton sateen utilities), locally-produced PLO copies of Iraqi Army Olive Green and light Khaki fatigues and camouflage uniforms (the latter being PLO Lizard and Czechoslovakian Vz 60 "Salamander" (Mlok) patterns or U.S. Woodland BDUs), civilian clothes, or a mix of both. Civilian or surplus military Parkas, OG US M-1965 field jackets and Iraqi copies of the Pakistani Army olive-brown woollen pullover were worn in cold weather.

Headgear
Usual headgear consisted of ex-Lebanese Army OG Baseball caps, Soviet M-38 Field Hats in Mustard Khaki cotton (Russian: Panamanka), and black or red berets worn French-style, pulled to the left; a black-and-white or red-and-white kaffiyeh was also worn around the neck as a foulard. Fleece caps and Ushanka-style black or brown fur hats were worn in the winter.

Footwear
Black leather combat boots initially came from Lebanese Army stocks or were provided by the PLO and the Syrians, complemented by high-top Pataugas olive canvas-and-rubber patrol boots. Several models of civilian sneakers or "trainers" were also used by Popular Guard fighters.

Accoutrements
Web gear consisted of Soviet three-cell AK-47 magazine pouches in Khaki or Olive Green canvas, ChiCom chest rigs in Khaki or OG cotton fabric for the AK-47 assault rifle and the SKS semi-automatic rifle, plus several variants of locally-made, multi-pocket chest rigs and assault vests in camouflage cloth, Khaki and OG canvas or Nylon. In addition, the US Army M-1956 Load-Carrying Equipment (LCE) in Khaki cotton canvas and the All-purpose Lightweight Individual Carrying Equipment (ALICE) in OG Nylon captured from the Lebanese Army, and IDF Olive Green Nylon Ephod Combat Vests seized either from the Lebanese Forces (LF) or the South Lebanon Army (SLA) were also widely used. Anti-tank teams issued with the RPG-7 rocket launcher received the correspondent Soviet rocket bag models in Khaki canvas, the Gunner Backpack 6SH12, the Assistant Gunner Backpack and the Munitions Bag 6SH11; Polish and East German versions in rubberized canvas were employed as well.

See also 
 Anwar Yassin
 George Hawi
 Arab Democratic Party
 Lebanese Civil War
 Lebanese Communist Party
 Lebanese National Resistance Front
 Lebanese National Movement
 List of weapons of the Lebanese Civil War
 Souha Bechara
 People's Liberation Army (Lebanon)
 War of the Camps

Footnotes

References

Afaf Sabeh McGowan, John Roberts, As'ad Abu Khalil, and Robert Scott Mason, Lebanon: a country study, area handbook series, Headquarters, Department of the Army (DA Pam 550-24), Washington D.C. 1989. – 
Chris McNab, 20th Century Military Uniforms (2nd ed.), Grange Books, Kent 2002. 
Edgar O'Ballance, Civil War in Lebanon 1975–92, Palgrave Macmillan, London 1998. 
 Fawwaz Traboulsi, Identités et solidarités croisées dans les conflits du Liban contemporain; Chapitre 12: L'économie politique des milices: le phénomène mafieux, Thèse de Doctorat d'Histoire – 1993, Université de Paris VIII, 2007. (in French) – 
 Itamar Rabinovich, The war for Lebanon, 1970–1985, Cornell University Press, Ithaca and London 1989 (revised edition). , 0-8014-9313-7 – 
 Jean Dunord, Liban: Les milices rendent leurs armes, RAIDS magazine n.º65, October 1991 issue.  (in French)
 Jennifer Philippa Eggert, Female Fighters and Militants During the Lebanese Civil War: Individual Profiles, Pathways, and Motivations, Studies in Conflict & Terrorism, Taylor & Francis Group, LLC, 2018. –  
 Leigh Neville, Technicals: Non-Standard Tactical Vehicles from the Great Toyota War to modern Special Forces, New Vanguard series 257, Osprey Publishing Ltd, Oxford 2018. 
 Moustafa El-Assad, Civil Wars Volume 1: The Gun Trucks, Blue Steel books, Sidon 2008. 
 Samer Kassis, 30 Years of Military Vehicles in Lebanon, Beirut: Elite Group, 2003. 
 Samer Kassis, Véhicules Militaires au Liban/Military Vehicles in Lebanon 1975–1981, Trebia Publishing, Chyah 2012. 
Samer Kassis, Invasion of Lebanon 1982, Abteilung 502, 2019.  – 
 Samir Makdisi and Richard Sadaka, The Lebanese Civil War, 1975–1990, American University of Beirut, Institute of Financial Economics, Lecture and Working Paper Series (2003 No.3), pp. 1–53. – 
 Paul Jureidini, R. D. McLaurin, and James Price, Military operations in selected Lebanese built-up areas, 1975–1978, Aberdeen, MD: U.S. Army Human Engineering Laboratory, Aberdeen Proving Ground, Technical Memorandum 11–79, June 1979.
 Yann Mahé, La Guerre Civile Libanaise, un chaos indescriptible (1975–1990), Trucks & Tanks Magazine n.º 41, January–February 2014, pp. 78–81.  (in French)
Zachary Sex & Bassel Abi-Chahine, Modern Conflicts 2 – The Lebanese Civil War, From 1975 to 1991 and Beyond, Modern Conflicts Profile Guide Volume II, AK Interactive, 2021. ISBN 8435568306073

Further reading

 Fawwaz Traboulsi, A History of Modern Lebanon: Second Edition, Pluto Press, London 2012. 
 Rex Brynen, Sanctuary and Survival: the PLO in Lebanon, Boulder: Westview Press, Oxford 1990.  – 
 Jean Sarkis, Histoire de la guerre du Liban, Presses Universitaires de France – PUF, Paris 1993.  (in French)
 Samir Kassir, La Guerre du Liban: De la dissension nationale au conflit régional, Éditions Karthala/CERMOC, Paris 1994.  (in French)
 Marius Deeb, The Lebanese Civil War, Praeger Publishers Inc., New York 1980. 
 William W. Harris, Faces of Lebanon: Sects, Wars, and Global Extensions, Princeton Series on the Middle East, Markus Wiener Publishers, Princeton 1997. , 1-55876-115-2

External links
Chamussy (René) – Chronique d'une guerre: Le Liban 1975–1977 – éd. Desclée – 1978 (in French)
Histoire militaire de l'armée libanaise de 1975 à 1990 (in French)
Popular Guard's camouflage patterns
Official Lebanese Communist Party website
Official LNRF/Jammoul website
Union of Lebanese Democratic Youth

Communism in Lebanon
Factions in the Lebanese Civil War
Lebanese Communist Party
Lebanese National Movement
Lebanese National Resistance Front